Stjepan Vego (born 9 July 1997) is a professional footballer who plays as a left-back. Born in Germany, he has represented Bosnia and Herzegovina internationally.

Club career

Early career
Vego started playing football at the age of 4 with SC Egenbüttel, and later Niendorfer. In 2014, he joined the youth team of Victoria Hamburg, before debuting for the first team in 2015. He stayed at Victoria until 2016. For a short period in 2017, Vego played for Hamburger SV III in the Landesliga Hamburg-Hammonia.

GOŠK Gabela
In summer 2017, Vego signed with, at the time, Bosnian Premier League club GOŠK Gabela. He made his competitive debut for GOŠK on 15 October 2017, in a 2–2 draw against Mladost Doboj Kakanj.

On 30 June 2018, Vego extended his contract with GOŠK. On 7 June 2019, after the club got relegated to the First League of FBiH, he decided to leave GOŠK.

Inter Zaprešić
On 7 June 2019, right after leaving GOŠK, Vego signed a contract with 1. HNL club Inter Zaprešić.

International career
Vego has represented Bosnia and Herzegovina at under-21 level and made one appearance for the team in a friendly match against Albania. He was later called-up to represent the Croatia under-21 team, but did not make an appearance.

Career statistics

Club

References

External links
Stjepan Vego profile at Sofascore.com

1997 births
Living people
Footballers from Hamburg
German people of Croatian descent
Croats of Bosnia and Herzegovina
Association football fullbacks
German footballers
Bosnia and Herzegovina footballers
Bosnia and Herzegovina under-21 international footballers
SC Victoria Hamburg players
NK GOŠK Gabela players
NK Inter Zaprešić players
NK Celje players
NK Hrvatski Dragovoljac players
FK Željezničar Sarajevo players
Bosnia and Herzegovina expatriate footballers
German expatriate footballers
Premier League of Bosnia and Herzegovina players
Croatian Football League players
Slovenian PrvaLiga players
Expatriate footballers in Croatia
Bosnia and Herzegovina expatriate sportspeople in Croatia
Expatriate footballers in Slovenia
Bosnia and Herzegovina expatriate sportspeople in Slovenia